Utsav Plus (formerly known as Star Plus UK) is a European Hindi general entertainment pay television owned by The Walt Disney Company India operated by Disney Star both divisions are owned by The Walt Disney Company. it's programming consists of family dramas, comedies, youth-oriented reality shows, shows on crime and television films. Its programming is in Hindi and subtitled in English.

History
Star Plus launched in the United Kingdom in 1993

Star Plus HD was set to launch in both the United Kingdom and Ireland by the end of 2011, but it was delayed until 5 July 2012.

Rebranding
On 12 July 2010, it underwent a rebranding along with a change from the blue rectangular logo to a ruby red star with the tagline "Rishta Wahi, Soch Nayi" ("Same Relationship, New Thinking").
 
On 7 November 2016, it underwent a rebranding with the tagline "Nayi Soch" ("New Thinking").
 
On 4 June 2018, it underwent a rebranding with Alia Bhatt as the face of the campaign with the red crystal star with gold swoosh along with the tagline "Rishta Wahi, Baat Nayi" ("Same Relationship, New Thing") and signature song composed by A. R. Rahman.
 
On 30 December 2020, Disney announced that the ‘Star’ branding in the Netherlands would be replaced with ‘Utsav’ in 2021.
On 11 January 2021, Star TV UK/Europe revealed that this new identity would apply in the UK and all of Europe from 22 January.

Programming
The channel launched two programming blocks: Star Dophar  and Star Zaika.

The programming of Star Dophar consists of reruns of Star India serials. Currently,  Kasautii Zindagii Kay airs on the 1PM afternoon time slot while other reruns air in the Morning time slot along with afternoon also.

‘Star Zaika’ consists of cooking shows which are aired during different times of the day on both Utsav Plus and Utsav Bharat. Previously, it also aired international shows dubbed in Hindi.

Serials

Reality Shows

Utsav Plus exclusives

Upcoming broadcast

References

External links

Television stations in Mumbai
Hindi-language television stations
Television channels and stations established in 2021
Foreign television channels broadcasting in the United Kingdom
Disney Star